The Taekwondo at the 2009 Lusophony Games was held in the Pavilhão Atlântico on July.

Medal table by country

Results

Men's Results

Women's Results

See also
ACOLOP

T
Lusophony Games
Taekwondo at the Lusofonia Games